Southern Railway (SR) No. 850 Lord Nelson (originally E850, BR no. 30850) is a preserved British steam locomotive of the Lord Nelson class. It forms part of the United Kingdom's National Railway Collection.

Overview 

850 was built at Eastleigh Works in 1926 to a design by R E L Maunsell, as the prototype for the sixteen-strong Lord Nelson class, and named after Horatio Nelson.

The Southern Railway became part of British Railways (BR) in 1948 through nationalisation, and was renumbered 30850. Under BR the class were given the power classification 7P. It was withdrawn in August 1962. It was preserved as part of the National Railway Collection, and is the sole survivor of the class.  It has run in preservation, including on the main line, where its TOPS number is 98750. Its boiler certification expired in 2015.

External links 
 

Preserved Southern Railway steam locomotives
Standard gauge steam locomotives of Great Britain
Railway locomotives introduced in 1926